Brandon Joel Tyler (born April 30, 1971) is an American former professional basketball player.

College career 
Tyler, a 6' 1" (185 cm) point guard, attended DePaul University for his freshman year and the University of Texas at Austin for his final three college years.

Professional career

Philadelphia 76ers (1994–1995) 
Tyler was taken twentieth overall in the 1994 NBA Draft by the Philadelphia 76ers. He played 55 games for them in 1994-95, averaging 3.5 points and 3.2 assists per game.

Prior to the 1995-96 NBA season, Tyler was selected by the Toronto Raptors in the 1995 expansion draft. According to journalist Chris Young's book Drive, Tyler accidentally fell asleep with a pack of ice on his ankle, causing severe nerve damage. Robbed of the speed that his game was based on, he was subsequently forced to retire.

Career statistics

NBA 

|-
| style="text-align:left;"|1994-95
| style="text-align:left;"|Philadelphia
| 55 || 8 || 14.7 || .381 || .314 || .700 || 1.1 || 3.2 || .7 || .0 || 3.5
|- class="sortbottom"
| style="text-align:center;" colspan="2"|Career
| 55 || 8 || 14.7 || .381 || .314 || .700 || 1.1 || 3.2 || .7 || .0 || 3.5

Notes

External links
College & NBA stats @ basketballreference.com

1971 births
Living people
African-American basketball players
All-American college men's basketball players
American men's basketball players
Basketball players from Texas
DePaul Blue Demons men's basketball players
Philadelphia 76ers draft picks
Philadelphia 76ers players
Point guards
Sportspeople from Galveston, Texas
Texas Longhorns men's basketball players
Toronto Raptors expansion draft picks
21st-century African-American sportspeople
20th-century African-American sportspeople